Amalia Malka Nathansohn Freud ( Nathansohn; 18 August 1835 – 12 September 1930) was the mother of Sigmund Freud. She was born in Brody, Kingdom of Galicia and Lodomeria to Jacob Nathanson and Sarah Wilenz and later grew up in Odesa, where her mother came from (both cities located in modern-day Ukraine). She was married to Jacob Freud.

Amalia Freud died in Vienna at the age of 95 of tuberculosis.

Children

On 6 May 1856, when Amalia Freud was 20 years old, she gave birth to her first child, Sigmund Schlomo, a famous neurologist and the founder of psychoanalysis.

Including Sigmund, she had 8 children with her husband Jacob Freud; however, her other children are not as renowned as their elder brother. They are enumerated below in the consecutive order of birth.

Julius (born in April 1857, died in December that year)
Anna (born on 31 December 1858, died on 11 March 1955)
Regine Debora (Rosa) (born on 21 March 1860, deported to Treblinka on 23 September 1942)
Marie (Mitzi) (born on 22 March 1861, deported to Treblinka 23 September 1942)
Esther Adolfine (Dolfi) (born on 23 July 1862 – died on 5 February 1943 in Theresienstadt)
Pauline Regine (Pauli) (born on 3 May 1864, deported to Treblinka on 23 September 1942)
Alexander Gotthold Efraim (born on 19 April 1866, died on 23 April 1943)

Character
Amalia was considered by her grandchildren to be an intelligent, strong-willed, quick-tempered but egotistical personality.  Ernest Jones saw her as lively and humorous, with a strong attachment to her eldest son whom she called "mein goldener Sigi".

Relationship with eldest son

Just as Amalia idolised her eldest son, so there is evidence that the latter in turn idealised his mother, whose domineering hold over his life he never fully analysed. He did however recount a railway journey with her at the age of 4 amongst his earliest memories and also recalled her instruction in German reading and writing. Late in life he would term the mother-son relationship "the most perfect, the most free from ambivalence of all human relationships. A mother can transfer to her son the ambition she has been obliged to suppress in herself". His tendency to split off and repudiate hostile elements in the relationship would be repeated with significant figures in his life such as his fiancée and Wilhelm Fliess.

See also
 Freud family

References

External links 
 Freud and his mother
 Freud and his mother Amalia, in her apartment in Vienna, 5 May 1926

1835 births
1930 deaths
People from Brody
People from the Kingdom of Galicia and Lodomeria
Amalia
Jews from Galicia (Eastern Europe)
Austro-Hungarian Jews
Ukrainian Jews
Austrian people of Ukrainian-Jewish descent
People from Vienna